Gibb may refer to:

 Gibb, surname
 The Gibb, Grittleton, Wiltshire, England, UK; a hamlet
 Gibb River, Kimberley, Western Australia, Australia; a river
 Gibb River Road, Kimberley, Western Australia, Australia
 Gibb High School, Kumta, Karnataka, India

See also

 Mr. Gibb (aka The Good Student), 2006 U.S. dark comedy film
 Robin Gibb (EP), 1985 EP by Robin Gibb
 James Gibb (disambiguation)
 John Gibb (disambiguation)
 Robert Gibb (disambiguation)
 Thomas Gibb (disambiguation)
 William Gibb (disambiguation)
 Gipp (surname)
 Gib (disambiguation)
 Gibbs (disambiguation)
 Gibbes (disambiguation)